Exminster Hospital is a former mental health facility at Exminster, Devon, England. It is a Grade II* listed building.

History
The hospital, which was designed by Charles Fowler using a radial plan of the panopticon type, opened as the Devon County Lunatic Asylum in July 1845. It was used as military hospital during the First World War and then became known as Devon Mental Hospital in the 1920s.

It was badly bombed during the Second World War and joined the National Health Service as Exminster Hospital in 1948 before becoming known as Exe Vale Hospital (Exminster Branch) in the 1970s. After the introduction of Care in the Community in the early 1980s, the hospital went into a period of decline and closed in July 1985. The main building was converted into apartments between 2001 and 2008 and is now known as Devington Park.

See also
Digby Hospital (a separate branch of Exe Vale Hospital)

References

Defunct hospitals in England
Hospitals in Devon
Hospital buildings completed in 1845
Hospitals established in 1845
1845 establishments in England
Former psychiatric hospitals in England
Grade II* listed buildings in Devon
Hospitals disestablished in 1985
1985 disestablishments in England